Lake Kalibari  is a Kali temple located at Southern Avenue in Kolkata, West Bengal, India. The official name of the temple is Sree Sree 108 Karunamoyee Kalimata Mandir after the name presiding deity Karunamoyee. The temple is managed by the Sree Sri Karunamoyee Kalimata Trust. The temple is undergoing reconstruction since 2002 and is due to be completed by 2013 but due to financial issues it has still not completed.

History 
The Lake Kalibari was founded by Haripada Chakraborty in 1949.

References

External links 
 Lake Kalibari, Kolkata

Hindu temples in Kolkata